The Cleaner is an A&E television series starring Benjamin Bratt.  It debuted on Tuesday, July 15, 2008, at 10:00 pm EST and the last episode aired on September 15, 2009, when the show was officially cancelled.

It was produced by Once a Frog Productions and CBS Productions.

Synopsis
William Banks is a recovering drug addict who lives in Los Angeles, California. When his daughter Lula was born, Banks "made a deal with God", pledging that if he is given a second chance, he will end his drug abuse and help others end their addictions to drugs and alcohol. Banks and his small team of recovering addicts begin to work to help others in recovering from their addictions. They will resort to unethical and illegal tactics in order to end their clients' addictions.

His success at cleaning people's addictions has gained him the respect of the LAPD and other officials, who almost always turn a blind eye to the vigilante's methods. In fact, the LAPD and other law officials will frequently refer clients to Banks. Banks appears to believe that his work is a calling and will therefore work pro bono if a client is too poor to afford his services.

Banks has a busy life; besides his addiction fighting capers, he runs a shop that primarily sells surfing equipment. His shop is connected to a garage where his business repairs automobiles and surfboards.  Besides that he also works at a drug rehabilitation center called Transitions.

Each episode typically begins with Banks having a one-way conversation with God (or "talking", as he refers to it), usually asking for guidance and clarity on his mission, the meaning of life and human nature, among other things.  Other times Banks will air his grievances to God, asking why He allows bad things to happen.  William's one-way communications with God are somewhat of a theme during the series, implying that his faith plays an important role in his sobriety.  However, whether all the scenes where Banks is shown praying out loud to God are real or whether they are simply illustrations of what is going on in his mind, are left ambiguous to the viewers.

The show's intro states that Banks also helps people overcome addictions to sex and gambling, however, neither one was the focus of an episode.

Production
The Cleaner, whose protagonist, according to A&E, helps others defeat their habits "by any means necessary", is the first original drama for this cable network in over six years.
The show is loosely based on the life of Warren Boyd who, as an addictions counselor, has helped such people as Mel Gibson, Courtney Love, and Whitney Houston. On October 27, 2008, A&E declared they would pick up a second season of The Cleaner. It went into production of thirteen all-new episodes, and premiered on June 23, 2009.  A&E opted not to renew the series for a third season on September 25, 2009.

Cast
Benjamin Bratt as William Banks
Grace Park as Akani Cuesta
Esteban Powell as Arnie Swenton
Kevin Michael Richardson as Darnell McDowell (season 1)
Amy Price-Francis as Melissa Banks, William's wife
Liliana Mumy as Lula Banks, William's daughter
Brett DelBuono as Ben Banks, William's son

Main crew
Steve Boyum
Félix Enríquez Alcalá (2 episodes, 2008)
Leon Ichaso (2 episodes, 2008)
Robert Munic (13 episodes, 2008)
Jonathan Prince (head writer)

Episodes

Series overview

Season 1: 2008

Season two

Home media
The first season of The Cleaner was released on DVD on June 9, 2009, and the second and final season was released on DVD on June 1, 2010.

Ratings
2008 first-run ratings for The Cleaner were 1.1 million in the 18-49 demographic. The series finale averaged 1.528 million viewers in live+7.

International airings

 The series was broadcast in Latin America through the A&E Latinamerica channel. Series one premiered on Sunday, October 5, 2008. The second season premiered on Tuesday, September 8, 2009.
 The first season premiered in Bulgaria in 2009 on AXN and the Second premiered in January 2010. In 2010 also the first season started on PRO.BG with different dub.
 The first season of the series premiered in Italy on Thursday September 10, 2009, on pay-TV channel Joi, (Mediaset Premium).
 The first season premiered in Ireland in January 2010, on RTÉ Two.
 The first season premiered in Kenya in January 2011, on nation tv.
 The first season premiered in Greece in April 2011, on Skai TV.
 The first and second season have been broadcast in Finland on nelonen.

References

External links
Official A&E site

2000s American drama television series
2008 American television series debuts
2009 American television series endings
A&E (TV network) original programming
American action television series
Television series by CBS Studios
American religious television series
English-language television shows
Television shows set in Los Angeles
Television series about dysfunctional families